"(You Bring Out) The Wild Side of Me" is a song written and recorded by American country music artist Dan Seals.  It was released in June 1984 as the first single from his album San Antone.  It peaked at No. 9 in mid-1984, thus becoming his second top ten hit on both the U.S. and Canadian country charts.

Chart positions

References

1984 songs
1984 singles
Dan Seals songs
Songs written by Dan Seals
Song recordings produced by Kyle Lehning
EMI America Records singles